Till I Met You is a 2016 Philippine romantic dramedy television series directed by Antoinette Jadaone, starring James Reid, Nadine Lustre and JC Santos. The series premiered on ABS-CBN's Primetime Bida evening block and worldwide on The Filipino Channel on August 29, 2016, to January 20, 2017, replacing Dolce Amore and was replaced by My Dear Heart.

Plot
Till I Met You follows the story of three friends — Iris (Nadine Lustre), a girl; Basti (James Reid), a boy; and Ali (JC Santos), a closeted homosexual — who eventually fall in love with each other and find themselves in an unusual love triangle. As conflicts arise, they are led into difficult situations whether to fight for their love or save their friendship.

Cast and characters

Main cast

Supporting cast

Extended cast

Guest cast

Special participation

Episodes

Production

Till I Met You marks the second romantic comedy TV series for James Reid and Nadine Lustre, following their successful On the Wings of Love. This also marks JC Santos' first lead role in a primetime series. It is also the first time real-life couple Carmina Villarroel and Zoren Legaspi are working together in a TV series.

Timeslot change
ABS-CBN decided to move Till I Met You to a later timeslot at 9:15pm starting September 19, 2016, after the conclusion of Born For You, to give way for Magpahanggang Wakas. This was also the same timeslot of James Reid and Nadine Lustre's past teleserye, On the Wings of Love.

The show ended on January 20, 2017, with a total of 105 episodes and was replaced by My Dear Heart, but the schedule time is after  Ang Probinsyano, A Love to Last took over Till I Met You's timeslot.

Reruns
The show began airing re-runs since January 2, 2023 on ALLTV.

Reception

Controversy
The Movie and Television Review and Classification Board (MTRCB) has summoned executives and producers of Till I Met You after complaints came in over inappropriate scenes and innuendo involving James Reid and Nadine Lustre. Summoned to attend the November 10 meeting were directors Antonette Jadaone and Andoy Ranay, executive producer Arnel Nacario and writer Shugo Praico. MTRCB said matters to be taken up include scenes from the October 25, 26, 27 and 28 episodes, “The 25 October 2016 episode includes a purportedly daring love-making scene inside a motor vehicle, which some audiences found to be unfit for television (despite its “SPG” advisory). As regards the 26 October 2016 episode, we received feedback as to the casual use of the words ‘sex lang ‘yan’ without reference to, or in disregard of, the institution of the marriage,” the MTRCB wrote. “The 27 and 28 October 2016 episodes, upon the other hand, contain allegedly ‘sexual teasing’ as well as more outrightly sexually-charged bath-related scenes (bearing only a “PG [Parental Guidance] advisory)—both of which were found by some audiences as inappropriate for television.”

“With the above, considering that “PG” and “SPG” ratings still admit the reality of having young audiences, the Board shall expect you to present your side at the said conference which shall be before a Committee particularly designated for the matter,” the MTRCB added.

Soundtrack

Awards and nominations

See also
 List of programs broadcast by ABS-CBN
 List of ABS-CBN drama series

References

External links

ABS-CBN drama series
Philippine romantic comedy television series
2016 Philippine television series debuts
2017 Philippine television series endings
Rating controversies in television
Television series by Dreamscape Entertainment Television
Television shows filmed in the Philippines
Television shows filmed in Greece
Filipino-language television shows
Television controversies in the Philippines